The 1929 New Zealand rugby tour to New South Wales was the 14th tour by the New Zealand national rugby union team to Australia.

For the first time since the First World War, Australia could present a real and official national team, after the activity of Rugby Union was suspended during the war and reprised only in New South Wales (many players switched to Rugby league especially in Queensland).

 won the 3 match Test series 3–0.

Preliminary matches 
Scores and results list New Zealand's points tally first.

Tour matches 
Scores and results list New Zealand's points tally first.

References 
All found on link

New Zealand
New Zealand tour
Australia tour
New Zealand national rugby union team tours of Australia